NZR Sumbersari Football Club is an Indonesian football club based in Malang, East Java that competes in Liga 3 and play their home match at Gajayana Stadium.

History
Starting from a group of village football lovers, currently starting their steps in the Liga 3 East Java zone. they have been around since 1985, Sumbersari FC was born and established as a soccer school under the name Sumbersari Putra. The name was taken from the name of the village of Sumbersari which is currently the village of Bandulan. Early they entered Liga 3 because of the lack of internal competition in Malang, so that players get playing minutes, this team was included in Liga 3, so that young players in soccer schools could feel the competition, Then in 2018, they changed their name to Sumbersari FC which was prepared to play in Liga 3 2018 in the East Java zone.

In 2019, this is the second year that Sumbersari FC has played in the Liga 3. With young players, the target is not a benchmark, the team must play well and show hard work. The results will follow later. Sumbersari FC will face a team with a big name, Deltras Sidoarjo. The mental and ability of Saiful Imron's team will be really tested. They became the first "village team" that qualified to Liga 3 Regional Round after finished 3rd place in 2019 Liga 3 East Java Group J. They are successful to qualify for the regional round in the 2019 season. However, their steps were stopped after they were defeated by Serang Jaya from Banten at that time, Entering early 2021, they changed their name to NZR Sumbersari FC. This is because Sumbersari FC already has a new investor and manager, namely the owner of the NZR Group, Wibie Dwi Andriyas.

On 9 November 2021, NZR Sumbersari made league match debut in a 5–1 win against Triple's Kediri at the Gajayana Stadium. On 16 December 2021, 2021 Liga 3 East Java has been held and NZR Sumbersari has become the champion to represent the province at the national level, not only being a regional champion, NZR Sumbersari has been undefeated in the struggle in the league zone since the competition was held on November 3, 2021. In the final match, they win 1–0 against Persedikab Kediri.

On 30 May 2022, during 2022 PSSI Ordinary Congress, the club officially changed their name to NZR Sumbersari F.C., from Sumbersari F.C..

Players

Current squad

Honours
 Liga 3 East Java
 Champion: 2021

References

External links
 NZR Sumbersari at PSSI JATIM
 NZR Sumbersari at Instagram

Football clubs in Indonesia
Football clubs in East Java
Association football clubs established in 1985
1985 establishments in Indonesia